Claire D. Clarke (died January 15, 2022) was an American politician.

Clarke lived in Boscawen, New Hampshire, with her husband since 1969. She was a counselor for the Winnisquam Regional School District. Clarke served on the Merrimack Valley School Board. Clarke served in the New Hampshire House of Representatives from 2001 until 2011 and was a Democrat. She died in Boscawen, New Hampshire.

References

Year of birth unknown
20th-century births
2022 deaths
People from Boscawen, New Hampshire
Women state legislators in New Hampshire
School board members in New Hampshire
Democratic Party members of the New Hampshire House of Representatives